George Bernard Worrell, Jr. (April 19, 1944 – June 24, 2016) was an American keyboardist and record producer best known as a founding member of Parliament-Funkadelic and for his work with Talking Heads. He is a member of the Rock and Roll Hall of Fame, inducted in 1997 with fifteen other members of Parliament-Funkadelic. Worrell was described by Jon Pareles of The New York Times as "the kind of sideman who is as influential as some bandleaders."

Biography

Early life
Worrell was born in Long Branch, New Jersey, and grew up in Plainfield, New Jersey, where his family moved when he was eight. A musical prodigy, he began formal piano lessons by age three and wrote a concerto at age eight. He went on to study at the Juilliard School and received a degree from the New England Conservatory of Music in 1967. As a college student, Worrell played with a group called Chubby & The Turnpikes; this ensemble eventually evolved into Tavares.

1970s
After meeting George Clinton, leader of a Plainfield-based doo wop group called The Parliaments, Worrell moved with Clinton, The Parliaments and their backing band, The Funkadelics, to Detroit, Michigan; thereafter, both groups became collectively known as Parliament-Funkadelic. During the 1970s the same group of musicians separately recorded under the names Parliament and Funkadelic, (among several others), but toured as P-Funk. Worrell played grand piano, Wurlitzer electric piano, Hohner Clavinet, Hammond B3 organ, ARP String Ensemble and Moog synthesizer, co-wrote, and wrote horn and rhythm arrangements on hit recordings for both groups and other associated bands under the "Parliafunkadelicment Thang" production company, and many of his most notable performances were recorded with Bootsy's Rubber Band, Parlet, The Brides of Funkenstein and The Horny Horns. Worrell recorded a 1978 solo album, All the Woo in the World, with the musical backing of P-Funk's members.

While funk musicians traditionally utilized electric keyboards, such as the Hammond organ and Fender Rhodes electric piano, Worrell was the second recipient of the Moog synthesizer created by Bob Moog. Mainly responsible for creating Parliament's futuristic sound, Worrell's use of the Minimoog bass on the Parliament song "Flash Light", on 1977's Funkentelechy Vs. the Placebo Syndrome, heavily influenced the sound of R&B music and served as a bridge between American R&B and the insurgence of new wave, new age and techno. He used the ARP Pro Soloist as well. Worrell played synthesizer and digital keyboard  on P funk songs throughout the 1970s, most notably "Mothership Connection (Star Child)" and "Give Up the Funk (Tear the Roof off the Sucker)" from Mothership Connection (1975) and "Aqua Boogie" from Motor Booty Affair (1978).

1980s
When Parliament-Funkadelic took a hiatus from touring in the early 1980s, Worrell was recruited, along with other musicians from differing musical genres such as guitarist Adrian Belew, to perform and record with Talking Heads. Worrell's experience and feel for different arrangements enhanced the overall sound of the band. Though he never officially joined Talking Heads, he was a de facto member of the group for most of the '80s, appearing on one of their studio albums, several solo albums, and two tours until they officially disbanded in 1991. Worrell can be seen in the band's concert film Stop Making Sense. Notably, Worrell was invited to perform with Talking Heads as part of their 2002 induction into the Rock and Roll Hall of Fame.

In 1983, Worrell provided keyboard parts for Mtume's hit song "Juicy Fruit".

Worrell co-produced Fred Schneider's 1984 solo album Fred Schneider and the Shake Society and played keyboards and synthesizers on some of the album's tracks.

In 1987 he appeared on the critically acclaimed solo release Casual Gods by Jerry Harrison of Talking Heads. The LP contained the US Album Rock Tracks chart hit "Rev It Up", which reached number seven and appeared in the movie "Something Wild". He worked with Jerry Harrison on his other releases also.

1990s–2010s
From the late 1980s through the 2010s, Worrell recorded extensively with Bill Laswell, including Sly and Robbie's Laswell-produced Rhythm Killers and the 1985 Fela Kuti album Army Arrangement. Worrell performed with Gov't Mule. Through the beginning of the 21st century, he became a visible member of the jam band scene, performing in many large summer music festivals, sometimes billed as Bernie Worrell and the Woo Warriors. He appeared on several Jack Bruce albums, including A Question of Time, Cities of the Heart, Monkjack and More Jack than God.

Worrell was a founding member of the CBS Orchestra when the Late Show with David Letterman launched in August 1993, playing lead synthesizer. Worrell departed in November when the orchestra added a horn section.

In 1994, Worrell appeared on the Red Hot Organization's compilation album, Stolen Moments: Red Hot + Cool. The album, meant to raise awareness and funds in support of the AIDS epidemic in the African-American community, was heralded as "Album of the Year" by Time magazine.

Worrell joined the rock group Black Jack Johnson, with Mos Def, Will Calhoun, Doug Wimbish and Dr. Know. He appears with the band on Mos Def's 2004 release The New Danger.

Worrell joined forces with bass legend Les Claypool, guitarist Buckethead and drummer Bryan Mantia to form the group Colonel Claypool's Bucket of Bernie Brains.

In 2009, he joined longtime Parliament-Funkadelic guitarist DeWayne "Blackbyrd" McKnight, bassist Melvin Gibbs and drummer J.T. Lewis to form the band SociaLybrium. Their album For You/For Us/For All was released on Livewired Music in January 2010.

Worrell appeared in the 2004 documentary film Moog with synthesizer pioneer Bob Moog and several other Moog synthesizer musicians. In 2011, he toured with Bootsy Collins, another major figure from Parliament-Funkadelic.

From 2011 through 2015, Worrell performed with his group, the Bernie Worrell Orchestra. The band became known for the appearance of special guests at live performances, including Bootsy Collins, Tina Weymouth, Chris Frantz, Jimmy Destri, Mike Watt, Rah Digga and Gary Lucas.

In 2012 and 2013, Worrell played a series of concerts with guitarist Steve Kimock, bassist Andy Hess, and vocalist-percussionist Camille Armstrong. Kimock's son John Morgan Kimock played drums for the group in 2013.

Worrell worked on the Seattle-based Khu.éex' project fusing traditional Tlingit music with funk, jazz, and experimental music. The project includes Preston Singletary, Skerik, Stanton Moore, Captain Raab and Randall Dunn among others.

In 2015, Worrell appeared in the movie Ricki and the Flash as the keyboard player in Meryl Streep's band. The movie reunited Worrell with director Jonathan Demme, who had directed Stop Making Sense.

Worrell was a judge for the 12th, 13th, and 14th annual Independent Music Awards.

During May 2016, the New England Conservatory of Music gave Worrell, who studied at the school until 1967, an honorary Doctor of Music degree.

Death
In January 2016, Worrell was diagnosed with a "mild form" of prostate cancer, stage-four liver cancer and stage-four lung cancer. He relocated from New Jersey, his long-time home, to Bellingham, Washington.

A tribute and benefit concert to raise funds for Worrell's cancer treatment, produced by the Black Rock Coalition and featuring musicians with whom Worrell has worked over his career, occurred on April 4 and 5, 2016.

On May 9, Worrell's wife Judie posted an update on his condition on his Facebook page:

Judie Worrell issued a statement on Facebook on June 16 to friends and family that "I was just told that Bernie is now headed 'Home'." She encouraged people close to Worrell to "visit him to say your goodbyes" and added that he is too ill to speak on the phone or text.

Bernie Worrell died at his home in Everson, Washington, on June 24, 2016, at the age of 72. His wife issued a statement that "Bernie transitioned Home to The Great Spirit. Rest in peace, my love—you definitely made the world a better place. Till we meet again, vaya con Dios."

Following his death, guitarist Buckethead created a 21.5 minute long tribute song: 'Space Viking'. Buckethead published it on his 'Pike' series, as part of Pike 245. The song was captioned: "To Bernie Worrell, The Greatest Music Maker Of All".

Documentary
Stranger: Bernie Worrell on Earth is a documentary film about Worrell's life, music and impact. At AllMovie, critic Mark Deming wrote that the film "profiles his life and career while also examining how even a genius has to find a way to make a living".

Discography

Solo albums

1978: All the Woo in the World
1990: Funk of Ages
1993: Blacktronic Science
1993: Pieces of Woo: The Other Side
1997: Free Agent: A Spaced Odyssey
2007: Improvisczario
2009: Christmas Woo
2010: I Don't Even Know
2011: Standards
2013: BWO Is Landing (credited as "The Bernie Worrell Orchestra")
2014: Elevation: The Upper Air
2016: Retrospectives

Funkadelic

1970: Funkadelic
1970: Free Your Mind... and Your Ass Will Follow
1971: Maggot Brain
1972: America Eats Its Young
1973: Cosmic Slop
1974: Standing on the Verge of Getting It On
1975: Let's Take It to the Stage
1976: Tales of Kidd Funkadelic
1976: Hardcore Jollies
1978: One Nation Under a Groove
1979: Uncle Jam Wants You
1996: Live: Meadowbrook, Rochester, Michigan – 12th September 1971
2008: Toys (recorded 1970–74)
2014: First Ya Gotta Shake the Gate

Parliament

1970: Osmium
1974: Up for the Down Stroke
1975: Chocolate City
1975: Mothership Connection
1976: The Clones of Dr. Funkenstein
1977: Live: P-Funk Earth Tour
1977: Funkentelechy Vs. the Placebo Syndrome
1978: Motor Booty Affair
1979: Gloryhallastoopid
1980: Trombipulation

Selected contributions to other albums

1981: Jerry Harrison, The Red and the Black
1982: George Clinton, Computer Games
1982: Talking Heads, The Name of This Band Is Talking Heads
1983: Talking Heads, Speaking in Tongues
1984: Talking Heads, Stop Making Sense
1984: Fred Schneider, Fred Schneider and the Shake Society
1985: Fela Kuti, Army Arrangement
1985: The Golden Palominos, Visions of Excess
1986: Ginger Baker, Horses & Trees
1987: Jerry Harrison, "Casual Gods"
1987: Jesse Rae, The Thistle
1992: Praxis, Transmutation (Mutatis Mutandis)
1995: Jack Bruce, Monkjack
1995: Julian Schnabel, Every Silver Lining Has a Cloud
1995: Third Rail (James Blood Ulmer & Bill Laswell), South Delta Space Age
1996: Pharoah Sanders, Message from Home
1998: Robben Ford, Tiger Walk 
1998: Live... With a Little Help from Our Friends [Gov’t Mule]
1998: Pharoah Sanders, Save Our Children
2001: Shin Terai, Unison
2004: Colonel Claypool's Bucket of Bernie Brains, The Big Eyeball in the Sky
2004: Mos Def, The New Danger
2005: Munkeez Strikin' Matchiz, Wreck It (with Bo Diddley and Chuck D.)
2006: Gigi, Gold & Wax
2006: Baby Elephant, Turn My Teeth Up
2007: Shin Terai, Lightyears
2007: Praxis, Tennessee 2004
2008: Praxis, Profanation (Preparation for a Coming Darkness)
2008: Science Faxtion, Living on Another Frequency
2009: Eric McFadden Trio, Delicate Thing
2016: Joe Marcinek Band, Slink
2017: Jesse Rae, Worae

Awards
Independent Music Awards 2013: "Get Your Hands Off" - Best Funk/Fusion/Jam Song

References

External links

Official website of Bernie Worrell
Stranger: Bernie Worrell on Earth
Interview at Artist Connection Podcast, October 2011
Interview NAMM Oral History Library, January 2012

Live Music Archive
Bernie Worrell
Bernie Worrell and the Woo Warriors
Bernie Worrell Orchestra

1944 births
2016 deaths
African-American rock musicians
American funk keyboardists
American session musicians
Paul Shaffer and the World's Most Dangerous Band members
Juilliard School alumni
Musicians from Washington (state)
New England Conservatory alumni
P-Funk members
People from Bellingham, Washington
People from Hampton, New Jersey
People from Long Branch, New Jersey
Musicians from Plainfield, New Jersey
Talking Heads
The Golden Palominos members
The Pretenders members
Colonel Claypool's Bucket of Bernie Brains members
Praxis (band) members
21st-century American keyboardists
Deadline (band) members
20th-century American keyboardists
Gramavision Records artists